Baitbus.com is a website specialising in gay pornography of the gay-for-pay type, which claims to bring "straight boys over to the dark side". It has been described as "part practical joke and part fantasy that plays with the contingency of straightness and straight male identity in particular" by Susanna Paasonen.

A typical Baitbus plot usually involves a male, seemingly a heterosexual stranger, being confronted by the cameraman. The cameraman typically talks to the other male, convincing him to get into the eponymous minibus, and receive a sum of money for having sex with a woman on camera. At some point in the proceedings, the man is blindfolded and another man, typically – but not always – acting as the bottom, proceeds to have oral sex with the other male. At this moment, the heterosexual male usually appears to be upset or angry at finding out that he has been engaging in sex with another male; however, when the heterosexual man is offered a larger quantity of money to continue his sex act with the gay male, he reluctantly agrees. He is then filmed having anal sex and administering cum shots, before being pushed out of the minibus. This, however, is recognized as mere depiction since there are similar acts in real life that led its perpetrator to be registered as a sex offender.

Shannon Gilreath writes that, on websites such as Baitbus.com, the inequalities faced by the gay community are thus sexualised, with heterosexuals on the top and gay men on the bottom. There is also the suggestion that it reflects the discourses of an antagonistic heterosexuality due to the outrage and disgust on the part of depicted in the encounter. Another reading also notes that it reflects the predatory gay male, prostituting straight men, making them abject in ways usually practiced on women.

See also 

Homosexual recruitment
Fake Taxi

References

External links
Baitbus website

Gay male pornography websites
Male bisexuality in fiction
American erotica and pornography websites